The Long–Allen Bridge is a truss bridge carrying Highway 8 across the Ouachita River at Harrisonburg in Catahoula Parish, Louisiana. This is the only point where Louisiana 8 crosses the Ouachita River in Louisiana.
The structure is considered to be in "Poor Standing" by the Louisiana DOTD. As of November 2017, the bridge was no longer in commission. In January 2018 the bridge was demolished

See also

 Long–Allen Bridge (disambiguation) for other bridges named for the same two governors

References

Truss bridges in the United States
Bridges completed in 1933
Road bridges in Louisiana
Buildings and structures in Catahoula Parish, Louisiana
1933 establishments in Louisiana
Ouachita River
2018 disestablishments in Louisiana
Demolished buildings and structures in Louisiana
Former road bridges in the United States
Transportation in Catahoula Parish, Louisiana